A language council, also known as a language regulator or a language academy, is an organisation that regulates a language. Some councils with independent association to any country where the language is dominant exist.

Examples
Cussel an Tavas Kernuak (the Cornish Language Council)
European Language Council
Norwegian Language Council
Polish Language Council
Swedish Language Council

See also
Académie française

Language regulators